Conchas Lake is a  long reservoir in northeastern New Mexico, behind Conchas Dam on the Canadian River.

Conchas Dam was completed in 1939 by the United States Army Corps of Engineers.

Adjacent to the lake is Conchas Lake State Park, which is divided into two separate areas, north and south. The state park has nine public boat ramps: five in the north area and four in the south area. The lake contains walleye, largemouth bass, White bass, Shad, Flathead catfish, channel catfish, bluegill, and crappie. The south area is located between the town of Conchas and Hooverville.

See also
San Miguel County, New Mexico

References

External links
 Conchas Lake State Park

Buildings and structures in San Miguel County, New Mexico
Dams in New Mexico
State parks of New Mexico
Parks in San Miguel County, New Mexico
Reservoirs in New Mexico
United States Army Corps of Engineers dams
Bodies of water of San Miguel County, New Mexico